Litian is a town of Liling City in Hunan Province, China. It is surrounded by Jingang Town on the north, Shangli County on the east, Guanzhuang Town on the west, and Baitutan Town on the south.

History
The town was established by merging 14 villages of the historic Nanqiao Town and 7 villages of the historic Fuli Town on November 26, 2015. As of 2015, it had a population of 62,800 and an area of 122.59 square kilometers.

Administrative division
The town is divided into 21 villages and 2 communities.

Education
There are two middle schools and one primary school in the town: Nanqiao Middle School, Fuli Middle School and Nanqiao Central Primary School.

Transportation

Railway
Shanghai–Kunming railway and Shanghai–Kunming high-speed railway, from Shanghai to Kunming, southwest China's Yunnan, through Litian Town.

National Highway
The G106 National Highway runs north-south through Litian Town.

References

Divisions of Liling